Album Title Goes Here (stylized as > album title goes here <) is the sixth studio album by Canadian electronic music producer Deadmau5, released on September 21, 2012 by Mau5trap and Ultra Records in the United States and Canada and by Parlophone Records in the United Kingdom. The album is considered to be more experimental than deadmau5's previous albums (such as 4×4=12), and he stated in an interview with Fuse that he had been considering producing music similar to his debut album Get Scraped again. It is the last studio album by deadmau5 to be released by Ultra Records, as well as his only album to be released by Parlophone.

Album Title Goes Here spawned five singles: "Maths", "The Veldt", "Professional Griefers", "Channel 42" and "Telemiscommunications". The album received a nomination for Best Dance/Electronica Album at the 55th Grammy Awards.

Background 
In a livestream on Ustream, deadmau5 said that the track "Sleepless" was supposed to contain the vocals he had recorded, but he claimed to have accidentally submitted the wrong file without the vocals. This led to the instrumental version of the song to appear on the final version of the album.

Promotion 
A music video directed by Paul Boyd was released for "Professional Griefers", which featured both deadmau5 and Gerard Way, and was promoted by Ultimate Fighting Championship (UFC). A fully animated music video for "The Veldt" made by Qudos Animations was released on 25 June 2012.

Reception

At Metacritic, which assigns a weighted mean rating out of 100 to reviews from mainstream critics, Album Title Goes Here received an average score of 59, based on 13 reviews, indicating "mixed or average reviews". Some critics commended the album's collaborations and excellent production value, but others criticized its lack of creativity.

Commercial performance  
The album debuted at number two on the Canadian Albums Chart with first-week sales of 13,000 copies.

Selling 58,000 copies in the United States in its first week, Album Title Goes Here debuted at number six on the Billboard 200 and at number one on the Dance/Electronic Albums chart, becoming deadmau5's first number-one album on the latter chart. It entered the UK Albums Chart at number nine on sales of 14,325 units, his highest-charting album in the United Kingdom to date.

Track listing

Charts

Weekly charts

Year-end charts

Certifications

Release history

References

External links
 > album title goes here < at Discogs

2012 albums
Deadmau5 albums
Parlophone albums
Ultra Records albums
Mau5trap albums